Under My Skin is a 1950 American sports drama film directed by Jean Negulesco and starring John Garfield and Micheline Presle. It is based on the 1923 short story "My Old Man", by Ernest Hemingway, about a jockey being threatened by a mobster after winning a race he had agreed to throw.

The Hemingway story was later adapted for a 1979 CBS television film, My Old Man, starring Kristy McNichol, Warren Oates, and Eileen Brennan.

Plot
Accused of throwing races back home, American jockey Danny Arnold now rides horses in Italy, where a gangster named Bork insists he deliberately lose a race. Dan double-crosses him, then avoids Bork's thugs, taking young son Joe with him to Paris.

Intending to look up an old friend, Dan learns from cafe owner Paule Manet that the friend was murdered by criminals due to unpaid debts. British jockey George Gardner is able to find Dan gainful employment at the racetrack, while Joe persuades his dad that a new horse of theirs called Gilford would make a fine steeplechase racer. Dan disappoints his son by winning money on a fixed race that involved George.

Bork and his henchmen turn up. They threaten to kill Dan if he doesn't lose the next steeplechase race. They have their own jockey in the race to make sure things go their way, but Dan defies them, with George's help. He wins the race, but when another horse runs into Gilford at the finish line, Dan is thrown off and killed.

Cast
 John Garfield as Dan Arnold
 Micheline Presle as Paule Manet
 Luther Adler as Bork
 Noel Drayton as George Gardner
 Orley Lindgren as Joe Arnold

External links
 

1950 films
1950s sports drama films
20th Century Fox films
American sports drama films
American black-and-white films
Films based on short fiction
Films based on works by Ernest Hemingway
Films directed by Jean Negulesco
Films scored by Daniele Amfitheatrof
American horse racing films
1950 drama films
1950s English-language films
1950s American films